Springbrook is an unincorporated community and census-designated place located in the town of Springbrook, Washburn County, Wisconsin, United States. Springbrook has a post office with ZIP code 54875. Its population was 76 in 2017.

History
Springbrook was originally called Namekegan, and under the latter name was founded in 1888. The present name was taken from a nearby brook which heads in a spring. A post office was established as Namekegan in 1888, and the name was changed to Springbrook in 1901.

References

Unincorporated communities in Washburn County, Wisconsin
Unincorporated communities in Wisconsin
Census-designated places in Washburn County, Wisconsin
Census-designated places in Wisconsin